Grand Internal Princess Consort Sunmok (Hangul: 순목부대부인, Hanja: 純穆府大夫人; 9 March 1818 – 8 January 1898), known before as Grand Internal Princess Consort Yeoheung, was a Korean noblewoman who became a Joseon dynasty royal family member through her marriage with Internal Prince Heungseon, and was the biological mother of Emperor Gojong of Korea.

When her son became Emperor, she was formally honored as Grand Primary Consort Sunmok (순목대원비, 純穆大院妃) in 1907 and therefore that was called Grand Internal Queen Consort Sunmok (순목대원왕비, 純穆大院王后) or Queen Sunmok (순목왕비, 純穆王后). It is said that she was a Catholicism believer, read the Ilgwamun (일과문, 日課文) and gave a thanksgiving mass at Unhyeon Palace (운현궁, 雲峴宮). When Catholicism was allowed by the Treaty of Korean and France in 1887, she was baptized in October 1896.

Biography

Early life
Lady Min was born on 9 March 1818, during the 18th year reign of King Sunjo of Joseon, as the eldest daughter and child of Min Chi-Gu and his wife, Lady Yi of the Jeonju Yi clan. Lady Min is the 3rd great-granddaughter of Min Jin-yeong (Queen Inhyeon’s younger half-brother). Her mother, Lady Yi was the aunt of Yi Ha-jeon, Prince Gyeongwon (Grand Internal Prince Deokheung's descendant).

At 13 years old, Min married Prince Namyeon's fourth son, Yi Ha-eung, who later became Grand Internal Prince Heungseon, in 1831. At first, Lady Min was given the rank of Shinin (Cautious Lady; 신인, 慎人) of Senior rank 3, and later Lady Shin (신부인, 慎夫人) with the same rank. When her husband was promoted to the rank of Prince and given the title Prince Heungseon (흥선군), Lady Min was given the title of Princess Consort (현부인) of Senior rank 2. 

With him, she had her first daughter in 1838, and then a son, Prince Imperial Heungchin, on 22 August 1845. She later gave birth to the future King Gojong on 9 September 1852, and lastly a second daughter in 1861. 

Her mother-in-law, Princess Consort Min, was the daughter of Min Gyeong-Hyeok, the 3rd great-grandson of Min Jeong-Jung, the elder brother of Min Yu-Jung and uncle of Queen Inhyeon. After Princess Consort Min’s death, it is said that Prince Namyeon was supported with extreme sincerity from his daughter-in-law.

A New Reign
In 1864, King Cheoljong died suddenly as the result of suspected foul play by the Andong Kim clan, an aristocratic and influential clan of the 19th century. Cheoljong was childless and had not appointed an heir. The Andong Kim clan had risen to power through intermarriage with the royal House of Yi. Queen Cheorin, Cheoljong's consort and a member of the Andong Kim clan, claimed the right to choose the next king, although traditionally the most senior Queen Dowager had the official authority to select the new king. Cheoljong's cousin, Grand Royal Queen Dowager Sinjeong, the widow of Heonjong of Joseon's father of the Pungyang Jo clan, who too had risen to prominence by intermarriage with the Yi family, currently held this title.

Queen Sinjeong saw an opportunity to advance the cause of the Pungyang Jo clan, the only true rival of the Andong Kim clan in Korean politics. As Cheoljong succumbed to his illness, the Grand Royal Dowager Queen was approached by Yi Ha-eung, a distant descendant of King Injo (r.1623–1649), whose father was made an adoptive son of Prince Eunsin, a nephew of King Yeongjo (r.1724–1776).

The branch that Yi Ha-eung's family belonged to was an obscure line of descendants of the Yi clan, which survived the often deadly political intrigue that frequently embroiled the Joseon court by forming no affiliation with any factions. Yi Ha-eung himself was ineligible for the throne due to a law that dictated that any possible heir had to be part of the generation after the most recent incumbent of the throne, but his second son Yi Myeongbok was a possible successor to the throne.

The Pungyang Jo clan saw that Yi Myeongbok was only 12 years old and would not be able to rule in his own name until he came of age, and that they could easily influence Yi Ha-eung, who would be acting as regent for his son. As soon as news of Cheoljong's death reached Yi Ha-eung through his intricate network of spies in the palace, he and the Pungyang Jo clan took the hereditary royal seal (considered necessary for a legitimate reign to take place and aristocratic recognition to be received), effectively giving Queen Sinjeong absolute power to select the successor to the throne. By the time Cheoljong's death became a known fact, the Andong Kim clan was powerless to act according to law because the seal already lay in the hands of Grand Royal Dowager Queen Shinjeong.

In the autumn of 1864, Yi Myeong-bok was crowned as King Gojong of Joseon, her husband given the title of Grand Internal Prince Heungseon (Korean: 대원군, Hanja: 大院君), and herself, Grand Internal Princess Consort Yeoheung.

Relation with Queen Min 
Prior to her husband’s regency and son’s reign as king, a relative of her clan, Min Chi-rok had died in 1858. The Princess Consort’s younger brother, Min Seung-ho, eventually became the adoptive son of Min Chi-rok in 1861 during King Cheoljong’s 12th year of reign. Thus becoming the adoptive older brother of Min Chi-rok’s only daughter, Min Ja-yeong.

When Gojong reached the age of 15, his father decided it was time for him to be married. The Grand Prince was diligent in his search for a queen who would serve his purposes: she must have no close relatives who would harbor political ambitions, yet come from a noble lineage so as to justify his choice to the court and the people. Candidates were rejected one by one, until she and her mother-in-law, Princess Consort Min, proposed a bride from their own clan, the Yeoheung Min. Min Ja-yeong came from the family line of Queen Inhyeon’s eldest brother, Min Jin-hu.

The two women described the girl persuasively: she was orphaned and possessed beautiful features, a healthy body, and an ordinary level of education. But after the meeting, her husband had stated that he felt slightly disturbed by Min Ja-yeong’s presence. Saying that she "...was a woman of great determination and poise“, but paid no mind to it. Her husband allowed the marriage between the 16 year old Lady Min and their 15 year old son where the marriage ceremony formally happened on 26 March 1866. Thus becoming Queen Min who would eventually participate in Royal politics.

During the beginning of the marriage, her son’s and husband’s relationship deteriorated to the point her daughter-in-law started to receive death threats from her husband. The Yeoheung Min clan and its relatives were also not safe as they were targeted by the Grand Internal Prince.

After Min Seung-ho and his adoptive mother, Lady Yi, died from a political bombing assassination in 1874, Min Gyeom-ho became the second adoptive son of Min Chi-rok. Ten years later, the Princess Consort and Queen Min suffered family losses in the Gapsin Coup of 1884 due to the Heungseon Daewongun and his supporters.

Because of her daughter-in-law’s interest and intervention in royal politics, relatives of their clan started being appointed to government and royal court positions. Which later prompted the resignation of her husband as regent and Queen Min as the successor when King Gojong took the throne and needed aid from his wife.

Political Conflicts of the Imo Incident 
When Heungseon Daewongun and Prince Yeongseon, her grandson, tried to get rid of Empress Myeongseong and her political power in the royal palace. She sent a person to her to inform them of their plans to save the life of the Empress. At the time of the Imo Incident and Donghak Peasant Movement, they sent a message to evacuate by informing her of some assassins' plans to enter.

In June 1882, Grand Internal Prince Heungseon was re-established power by the old-fashioned army who revolted during the time of Imogunran (임오군란). Heo Ok (허욱), his assistant, dressed as a soldier and went to the palace during this time and played a role of pointing to Empress Myeongseong, but he couldn't find her. The Heungseon Daewongun ordered an attack on the administrative district of Seoul that housed the Gyeongbokgung, the diplomatic quarter, military centers, and science institutions. The soldiers attacked police stations to free comrades who had been arrested and then began ransacking private estates and mansions belonging to relatives of the Queen Consort. These units then stole rifles and began to kill Japanese training officers, and narrowly missed killing the Japanese ambassador to Seoul, who quickly escaped to Incheon.

The military rebellion then headed towards the palace but both Queen Consort and the King escaped ahead of time in disguise and fled to her relative's villa in Cheongju, where they remained in hiding. But it was also said that to escape without getting caught, the Empress Myeongseong disguised herself in advance by acting as Hong Gye-hoon's sister, and was carried on the back of Hong Gye-hun. She was able to escape the city and go to Yeoju to hide.

On 10 June, members of the old military became resentful of the special treatment of the new units and so they destroyed the house of her younger brother, Min Gyeom-ho, and killed him, who was the administrative head of the training units; Yi Choi-eung (Heungseon Daewongun’s brother) and Kim Bo-hyun were also killed. These soldiers then fled to the protection of the Heungseon Daewongun, who publicly rebuked but privately encouraged them. The Heungseon Daewongun then took control of the old units.

It was also said that when Grand Internal Princess Consort Sunmok had entered the palace, she hid Empress Myseongseong, in what was probably a wooden litter she was riding on, but was seen by a court officer who then told the soldiers that were invading the palace. The Princess Consort then tried to persuade the Heungseon Daewongun to stop chasing after the queen which gave him suspicions. At that time, Royal guard Hong Jae-Hui (홍재희) (later renamed Hong Gye-Hun) said, That woman is my sister who is from the upper palace, you must not be mistaken. Min belatedly noticed this fact and the Heungseon Daewongun became violently resentful towards her after the ordeal, and kept her away from his affairs.

Later life 

The Princess Consort later converted to Catholicism in 1896 where she was the given the baptismal name, Maria (마리아).

She later died on 8 January 1898 during her son’s 2nd year of reign as Emperor. Her husband later followed on 22 February 1898. 

Both are buried in Namyang, Gyeonggi Province. After her death, she was  posthumously honoured as Queen Sunmok (순목왕비, 純穆王后) or Queen Sunmokdaewon (순목대원왕후, 純穆大院王后). In 1907, her husband was also honoured as King Heungseon Heonui Daewon (흥선헌의대원왕, 興宣獻懿大院王).

Family
 Great-Great-Great-Great-Great-Great-Great-Great-Grandfather
 Min Hyo-son (Hangul: 민효손, Hanja: 閔孝孫)
 Great-Great-Great-Great-Great-Great-Great-Great-Grandmother
 Lady Yun of the Papyeong Yun clan (본관: 파평 윤씨); daughter of Yun Ji-kang (윤지강의 딸)
 Great-Great-Great-Great-Great-Great-Great-Grandfather
 Min Yeo-jun (민여준, 閔汝俊) (1539 - 1599)
 Great-Great-Great-Great-Great-Great-Great-Grandmother
 Lady Yi of the Jeonju Yi clan (전주 이씨, 全州 李氏); descendant of Grand Prince Hyoryeong
 Great-Great-Great-Great-Great-Great-Grandfather
 Min Gi (Hangul: 민기, hanja: 閔箕) (1568–18 January 1641)
 Great-Great-Great-Great-Great-Great-Grandmother
 Lady Hong of the Namyang Hong clan (남양 홍씨, 南陽 洪氏); daughter of Hong Ik-hyeon (홍익현, 洪翼賢)
 Great-Great-Great-Great-Great-Grandfather
 Min Gwang-hun (Hangul: 민광훈, Hanja: 閔光勳) (1595–1659), scholar during the reign of King Injong.
 Great-Great-Great-Great-Great-Grandmother
 Lady Yi of the Yeonan Yi clan (본관: 연안 이씨); (이광정의 딸) daughter of Yi Gwang-jeong (이광정, 李光庭) and Lady Heo of the Yangcheon Heo clan (본관: 양천 허씨, 陽川 許氏)
 Great-Great-Great-Great-Grandfather
 Min Yu-jung (민유중, 閔維重) (1630 - 29 June 1687); Queen Inhyeon’s father (second Queen consort of King Sukjong)
Great-Great-Great-Great-Grandmother
 Internal Princess Consort Pungchang of the Pungyang Jo clan (풍창부부인 풍양 조씨, 豊昌府夫人 豊壤 趙氏) (1659 - 1741); Min Yu-jung’s third wife
 Great-Great-Great-Grandfather
 Min Jin-yeong (민진영, 閔鎭永) (1682 - 1724); Queen Inhyeon’s younger half-brother
 Great-Great-Grandfather
 Min Ak-Su (민악수, 閔樂洙)
 Great-Grandfather
 Min Baek-Sul (민백술, 閔百述)
 Grandfather 
 Min Dan-Hyeon (민단현, 閔端顯)
 Grandmother
 Lady Park of the Malyang Park clan (말양 박씨)
Father 
 Min Chi-gu (민치구, 閔致久) (1795 - 1874)
Mother
 Lady Yi of the Jeonju Yi clan (? - 17 November 1873) (정경부인 전주 이씨)
Grandfather - Yi Ok (이옥, 李[火玉}) (1773 - 1820)
Grandmother - Lady Kim of the Gyeongju Kim clan (공인 경주 김씨, 恭人 慶州 金氏) (1770 - 1832)
 Uncle - Yi Si-hak (이시학, 李時學) (1794 - 1852)
 Aunt - Lady Sim of the Seonin Sim clan (선인 심씨, 宣人 沈氏) (1792 - 1870)
 Cousin - Yi Tae-jeon (이태전, 李台銓) (1814 - 1849)
 Cousin - Yi Gyu-jeon (이규전, 李奎銓) (1818 - 1862)
 Cousin - Lady Yi of the Jeonju Yi clan (전주 이씨)
 Uncle - Yi Si-in, Prince Wanchang (이시인 완창군, 李時仁 完昌君) (2 May 1805 - 11 March 1843)
 Aunt - Princess Consort Namwon of the Namwon Yun clan (남원군부인 윤씨, 南原郡夫人 尹氏) (22 May 1803 - 15 April 1835)
 Aunt - Princess Consort Gyeongju of the Gyeongju Kim clan (경주군부인 김씨, 慶州郡夫人 金氏) (19 July 1816 - 9 March 1863)
 Cousin - Yi Ha-jeon, Prince Gyeongwon (경원군 이하전, 慶原君 李夏銓) (15 February 1842 - 20 August 1862)
 Cousin-in-law - Seo Dae-hye (서대혜, 徐大慧), Princess Consort Dalseong of the Dalseong Seo clan (달성군부인 서씨) (15 January 1842 - 1924)
 Siblings
 Younger brother - Min Seung-ho (민승호, 閔升鎬) (1830 - 1874); adoptive son of Min Chi-rok
 Sister-in-law - Lady Kim of the Gwangsan Kim clan (본관: 광산 김씨, 光山 金氏) (? - ? 23 April)
 Unnamed nephew (? - 1874)
 Adoptive nephew - Min Yeong-ik (민영익, 閔泳翊) (1860 - 1914)
 Sister-in-law - Lady Kim of the Yeonan Kim clan (본관: 연안 김씨, 延安 金氏) (? - ? 11 February)
 Sister-in-law - Lady Yi of the Deoksu Yi clan (본관: 덕수 이씨, 德水 李氏) (? - ? 1 July)
 Adoptive younger brother - Min Tae-ho (민태호, 閔台鎬) (1834 - 1884 18 October)
 Adoptive sister-in-law - Internal Princess Consort Paseong of the Paepyeong Yun clan (파성부부인 파평 윤씨, 坡城府夫人 坡平 尹氏)
 Adoptive sister-in-law - Internal Princess Consort Jinyang of the Jincheon Song clan (진양부부인 진천 송씨, 鎭陽府夫人 鎭川 宋氏); (본관: 진천 송씨) Min Tae-ho’s second wife
 Adoptive nephew - Min Yeong-ik (민영익, 閔泳翊) (1860 - 1914); adoptive son of Min Seung-ho
 Adoptive niece - Empress Sunmyeong of the Yeoheung Min clan (순명황후 민씨) (20 November 1872– 5 November 1904)
 Adoptive nephew - Min Yeong-rin (민영린, 閔泳璘) (1873 - 1 June 1932); son of Min Sul-ho (민술호, 閔述鎬)
 Adoptive sister-in-law - Internal Princess Consort Uichang of the Uiryeong Nam clan (의창부부인 의령 남씨, 宜昌府夫人 宜寧 南氏)
 Younger brother - Min Gyeom-ho (민겸호, 閔謙鎬) (1838 - 10 June 1882); adoptive son of Min Chi-rok
 Sister-in-law - Lady Seo (서씨, 徐氏)
 Nephew - Min Yeong-hwan (민영환, 閔泳煥) (7 August 1861 - 30 November 1905)
 Nephew - Min Yeong-chan (민영찬, 閔泳瓚) (3 December 1873 - 16 November 1948)
 Younger sister - Lady Min of the Yeoheung Min clan (본관: 여흥 민씨, 驪興 閔氏) (1859 - 1942)
 Brother-in-law - Ju Eung-seon of the Sinan Joo clan (주용선) (본관: 신안 주씨) (1853 - 1925)
Nephew - Ju Yang-gyu (주양규) (1904 - 1999)
Husband 
 Yi Ha-Eung, Grand Internal Prince Heungseon (21 December 1820 - 22 February 1898) (이하응 흥선대원군)
Father-in-law - Yi Gu, Prince Namyeon (22 August 1788 – 19 March 1836) (이구 남연군)
 Mother-in-law - Princess Consort Min of the Yeoheung Min clan (26 June 1788 – 1831) (군부인 여흥 민씨)
Issue:

 Daughter - Lady Yi of the Jeonju Yi clan (이씨, 李氏) (1838 - 1869)
 Son-in-law - Jo Gyeong-ho (조경호, 趙慶鎬) of the Imcheon Jo clan (1839 - 1914)
 Grandson - Jo Han-guk (조한국, 趙漢國)
 Granddaughter - Lady Jo of the Imcheon Jo clan (임천 조씨, 林川趙氏)
 Grandson-in-law - Kim Heung-gyu (김흥규)
 Granddaughter - Lady Jo of the Imcheon Jo clan (임천 조씨, 林川趙氏) (2 September 1864 - ?); Yi Jae-guk’s first wife
 Grandson-in-law - Yi Jae-guk (이재극, 李載克) of the Jeonju Yi clan (6 November 1864 - 1931)
 Great-Granddaughter - Lady Yi of the Jeonju Yi clan (이씨, 李氏)
 Great Grandson-in-law - Min Byeong-gil (민병길)
 Great-Granddaughter - Lady Yi of the Jeonju Yi clan (이씨, 李氏)
 Great Grandson-in-law - Min Jeong-sik (민정식)
 Great-Grandson - Min Seong-gi (민성기)
 Granddaughter - Lady Jo of the Imcheon Jo clan (임천 조씨, 林川趙氏)
 Grandson-in-law - Lee Myeon-gu (이면구)
Son - Yi Jae-myeon, Prince Imperial Heungchin (22 August 1845 – 9 September 1912) (이재면 흥친왕)
Daughter-in-law - Lady Hong of the Pungsan Hong clan (8 April 1844 - 19 December 1887) (풍산 홍씨)
Grandson - Yi Jun-Yong, Prince Yeongseon (23 July 1870 - 22 March 1917) (이준용 영선군)
Grandson - Yi Mun-Yong (4 September 1882 - 8 October 1901) (이문용)
 Granddaughter - Lady Yi of the Jeonju Yi clan (전주 이씨)
 Granddaughter - Lady Yi of the Jeonju Yi clan (전주 이씨)
Daughter-in-law - Princess Imperial Heungchin of the Yeoju Yi clan (7 June 1883 - 8 January 1978) (흥친왕비 여주 이씨)
Son - Yi Myeong-bok, Emperor Gojong of Korea (8 September 1852 – 21 January 1919) (이희 대한제국 고종황제)
Daughter-in-law: Empress Myeongseong of the Yeoheung Min clan (17 November 1851 – 8 October 1895) (명성황후 여흥 민씨)
Unnamed Grandson (4 November 1871 - 8 November 1871)
Unnamed Granddaughter (3 February 1873 - 28 September 1873)
Grandson - Crown Prince Yi Cheok (25 March 1874 – 24 April 1926) (이척 황태자)
Granddaughter-in-law: Empress Sunmyeong of the Yeoheung Min clan (20 November 1872– 5 November 1904) (순명황후 여흥 민씨)
Granddaughter-in-law: Empress Sunjeong of the Haepyeong Yun clan (19 September 1894– 3 February 1966) (순정황후 해평 윤씨) 
Unnamed Grandson (5 April 1875 - 18 April 1875)
Unnamed Grandson (18 February 1878 - 5 June 1878)
 Daughter - Lady Yi of the Jeonju Yi clan (증 정경부인 전주 이씨) (1861 - 1899)
 Son-in-law - Jo Jeong-gu (조정구, 趙鼎九) of the Pungyang Jo clan (1860 - 1926)
 Grandson - Jo Nam-seung (조남승, 趙南升)
 Grandson - Jo Nam-ik (조남익, 趙南益)
 Grandson - Jo Nam-bok (조남복, 趙南復)
 Grandson - Jo Nam-jin (조남진, 趙南晉)
 Granddaughter - Jo Gye-jin (조계진, 趙啓珍)
 Grandson-in-law - Yi Gyu-hak (이규학, 李圭鶴) of the Gyeongju Yi clan (경주 이씨, 慶州 李氏)
 Granddaughter - Lady Jo of the Pungyang Jo clan (풍양 조씨, 豐壤 趙氏)
 Grandson-in-law - Sim Jae-seung (심재승, 沈載承) of the Cheongsong Sim clan (청송 심씨, 靑松 沈氏)

In popular culture
Portrayed by Uhm Yoo-Shin in the 1990 MBC TV series Daewongun.
Portrayed by Kim Chang-Sook in the 1995 KBS TV series Dazzling Dawn.
 Portrayed by Lee Deok-Hee in the 2001–2002 KBS2 TV series Empress Myeongseong.

See also
Grand Internal Prince Heungseon
Prince Imperial Heung
Gojong of Korea
Queen Wongyeong
Queen Inhyeon
Empress Myeongseong

References
Cites

External links

1818 births
1898 deaths
Yeoheung Min clan
19th-century Korean women
19th-century Korean people
Joseon Christians
People from Seoul